The fourth edition of the football tournament at the Pan American Games was held in São Paulo, Brazil, from April 20 to May 4, 1963. Five teams competed in a round-robin competition, with Argentina being the defending champions. Brazil, Argentina and Chile qualified for the tournament at the beginning of the year, while Peru and Paraguay did not.

Matches were held in Estádio Comendador Sousa and Estádio Parque São Jorge, both in Sao Paulo.

Final table

Matches

Medalists

Goalscorers

References

1963
1963 Pan American Games
Pan American Games
Pan
1963